Abbasabad-e Gol Shaygan (also Romanized as ‘Abbāsābād-e Gol Shāygān and ‘Abbāsābād-e Gol Shāyān; also known as ‘Abbāsābād-e Golshār) is a village in Akhtarabad Rural District, in the Central District of Malard County, Tehran Province, Iran. At the 2006 census, its population was 22, in 5 families.

References 

Populated places in Malard County